"A Dream Within a Dream" is a poem written by American poet Edgar Allan Poe, first published in 1849. The poem has 24 lines, divided into two stanzas.

Analysis
The poem dramatizes the confusion felt by the narrator as he watches the important things in life slip away. Realizing he cannot hold on to even one grain of sand, he is led to his final question whether all things are just a dream.

It has been suggested that the "golden sand" referenced in the 15th line signifies that which is to be found in an hourglass, consequently time itself. Another interpretation holds that the expression evokes an image derived from the 1848 finding of gold in California. The latter interpretation seems unlikely, however, given the presence of the four, almost identical, lines describing the sand in another poem "To ——," which is regarded as a blueprint for "A Dream Within a Dream" and preceding its publication by two decades.

Publication history
The poem was first published in the March 31, 1849, edition of the Boston-based story paper The Flag of Our Union. The same publication had only two weeks before first published Poe's short story "Hop-Frog." The next month, owner Frederick Gleason announced it could no longer pay for whatever articles or poems it published.

Adaptations

Picnic at Hanging Rock, a story about a group of girls disappearing while on a field trip to a rock formation in the early 20th century, begins with a voice over that states "What we see and what we seem is but a dream. A dream within a dream".
The Alan Parsons Project's album Tales of Mystery and Imagination Edgar Allan Poe opens with an instrumental homage to the poem. Its 1987 re-release included a narration by Orson Welles.
The Propaganda album A Secret Wish, released in 1985, opens with the track "Dream Within A Dream". The poem is recited in spoken-word form by vocalist Susanne Freytag.
Biological Radio, the 1997 Dreadzone album, features the track "Dream Within A Dream" which quotes lines from the poem.
 The Yardbirds' recorded a musical adaptation for their 2003 album Birdland, adding a new verse of their own.
 Elysian Fields recorded a musical adaptation of the song.
 Sopor Aeternus and The Ensemble of Shadows adapted the poem for their album Poetica - All Beauty Sleeps.
 Korean boy group NCT utilized the poem as a concept base, mentioning "Dream Within a Dream" several times throughout their discography. Examples include "Dream in a Dream" by TEN (NCT 2018 Empathy, 2018) and "INTERLUDE: Regular-Irregular" by NCT 127 (Regular-Irregular, 2018), with additional references in media.

References

External links

 A Dream Within A Dream, from about.com.
 Video of A Dream Within a Dream
 

Poetry by Edgar Allan Poe
1849 poems
Works originally published in The Flag of Our Union